Saitō Toshikazu (齋藤俊一) (died 1582), also known as Saitō Toshizo (斎藤歳三), was lord of Ikuchiyama in Tanba Province as well as a member of the Saitō clan. Toshikazu was  Saito Tatsuoki cousin, head of Saitō clan.

In 1567, after the Battle of Inabayama, Toshikazu became a vassal of Akechi Mitsuhide, who was a retainer of the Oda clan. 

In 1582, at the Battle of Yamazaki, the battle between Oda Nobunaga's two de facto successors, Akechi Mitsuhide and Toyotomi Hideyoshi. Toshikazu became a commander of Akechi clan forces. During the battle, he tried to flank Hideyoshi's lines but was defeated and executed by Horio Mosuke.

See also
 Saitō Toshimitsu

References 

Samurai
People of Azuchi–Momoyama-period Japan
1582 deaths
Year of birth unknown